Victoria Longley may refer to:

 Victoria Longley (born 1960), Australian actress
 Vicky Longley (born 1988), British actress